St. Denis is a passenger rail station on the MARC Camden Line in the Maryland town of the same name. While the small station is the line's closest station to its terminus at Camden Yards in Baltimore, it has low ridership and is designated a flag stop: trains do not stop unless the engineer sees passengers who are waiting to be picked up, or the conductor is aware that there are passengers who want to be dropped off.

St. Denis station contains two platforms and three tracks. The southbound platform, located on the corner of Arlington and Maple Avenues, has a shelter that is made of Plexiglas and aluminum. MARC gives this platform as the official address of the station. The northbound platform contains a wooden shelter on an embankment at the end of East Street with the name of the station on the back of it. The station also contains two at-grade wooden pedestrian crossings, one which spans the entire right-of-way from Arlington Avenue to East Street, and the other which only runs from the southbound platform on Maple Avenue to the middle tracks.

East of St. Denis, the Camden Line crosses over the MARC Penn Line south of the Halethorpe MARC station. The station itself, is an excellent spot for railfanning due to its proximity to Baltimore and its location at a point that sees Capital Subdivision, Baltimore Terminal Subdivision, and Old Main Line Subdivision freight traffic. A junction leading to the B&O Railroad Museum also exists between here and the terminus at Camden Yards.

Station layout

Accessibility
The station is not compliant with the Americans with Disabilities Act of 1990, lacking raised platforms for level boarding.

Communities served
 St. Denis, Maryland, community surrounding the station
 Relay, Maryland, located just north of the station
 Elkridge, Maryland, 1.2 miles away (24 minute walk)

Nearby attractions
 Patapsco Valley State Park, Avalon Area
 Elkridge Furnace Complex
 Thomas Viaduct
 Guinness Brewery

References

External links
 
 St. Denis MARC Station (TrainWeb)
 Station from Google Maps Street View

Camden Line
MARC Train stations
Former Baltimore and Ohio Railroad stations